The Bryce Commission was a Commission set up in 1917 to consider reform of the House of Lords.

References

House of Lords
1917 in the United Kingdom
Reform in the United Kingdom